Mildred Clinton (November 2, 1914 – December 18, 2010) was an American actress. Clinton had a supporting part in Serpico (1973), and starred in the 1976 horror film Alice, Sweet Alice. In her later career she frequently collaborated with director Spike Lee, appearing in small parts in his films Crooklyn (1994), Summer of Sam (1999), and Bamboozled (2000).

Biography
Clinton was born in 1914 in Brooklyn, New York City. She had her first film role in The Trapp Family in America (1958), and later appeared in Sidney Lumet's Serpico (1973), playing the mother of Frank Serpico (portrayed by Al Pacino). In 1976, she appeared in a lead role in the low-budget horror film Alice, Sweet Alice. Clinton also worked in theater, appearing in a minor part in a 1954–1955 Broadway production of Quadrille, and as Miss Sullivan in The Wrong Way Lightbulb in 1969.

In addition to film and theater, Clinton was a frequent actress in radio plays for CBS Radio Mystery Theater, and also had a recurring role as Judge Sussman on the soap opera The Edge of Night from 1975 to 1976. In her later career, Clinton appeared in several films by Spike Lee: Crooklyn (1994), Summer of Sam (1999), and Bamboozled (2000), the latter of which was her last film credit.

On television, Clinton had a one-woman show, One Woman's Experience that debuted on WABD in New York City on October 8, 1952.

Clinton died on December 18, 2010 in New York City.

Filmography

Film

Television

References

External links

1914 births
2010 deaths
Actresses from New York City
American film actresses
American stage actresses
American television actresses
21st-century American women